Events in the year 2018 in Haiti.

Incumbents
 President: Jovenel Moïse 
 Prime Minister: Jack Guy Lafontant

Events
2018 Haiti earthquake

Deaths

6 January – Emerante Morse, dancer and folklorist (b. 1918).

26 June – Henri Namphy, military officer and politician (b. 1932).

References

 
2010s in Haiti
Years of the 21st century in Haiti
Haiti
Haiti